Daria Belikova (born 7 March 1997) is a Russian handballer who plays for Dinamo-Sinara and the Russian national team.

International honours
EHF Champions League:
Fourth place: 2015

References
 

  
1997 births
Living people
Sportspeople from Volgograd
Russian female handball players  
Handball players at the 2014 Summer Youth Olympics